Anju may refer to:

Arts and entertainment
 Anju, a character in The Legend of Zelda series
 Anju Maaka, a character in the Chibi Vampire series
Anchu Sundarikal (or Anju Sundarikal), a 1968 Malayalam film

People
 Anju (given name), including a list of people with the name
 Anju (actress), Indian actress in Malayalam and Tamil films

Places
 Anju, Iran, a village in Chaharmahal and Bakhtiari Province, Iran
 Anju, South Pyongan, a city of South Pyongan province, North Korea
 Anju Castle
 Anju T'an'gwang Line, a railway line; more commonly known as Sŏhae Line
 Anju District, district of Suining, Sichuan, China
 Anju railway station, Inner Mongolia, China
 Anju, Sui County (安居镇), a town in Sui County, Suizhou, Hubei, China

Other uses
 Anju (food), a general term for Korean side dishes consumed while drinking
 Housing (TV series) or Anju, a 2016 Chinese TV series

See also

 Anjou (disambiguation)